The Challenge of Barletta (Italian: Disfida di Barletta) was a duel fought in the countryside of Trani, near Barletta, southern Italy, on 13 February 1503, during the Third Italian War, on the plains between Corato and Andria.

Overview
The tournament was provoked by a French knight Charles de la Motte who, after drinking too much of the local wine, made disparaging remarks about the Italians. It consisted in a mounted tourney between 13 Italians (the most famous being Ettore Fieramosca), who were part of the Spanish army based in Barletta, and 13 French knights who were based in Canosa di Puglia. The Italian knights won the battle, and the French had to pay ransom. Barletta has since acquired the appellation Città della Disfida (City of the Challenge) as a result.

The event inspired a historical novel by the Italian writer Massimo D'Azeglio, Ettore Fieramosca, or  La disfida di Barletta, written in 1833. A comedic version of the fight is also depicted in the 1976 Italian comedy film Il Soldato di Ventura.

Challenge

Cause of the challenge 

French troops made an incursion up to Canosa di Puglia, where they had a small fight with Spanish troops. A few French soldiers were made prisoners and were brought to Barletta. Among the French prisoners there was the nobleman Charles de Torgues, also known as Monsieur Guy de la Motte.

On 15 January 1503 the French prisoners were invited to take part to a banquet during which la Motte questioned the valor and courage of Italian soldiers, then allied with the Spaniards. A diatribe followed. In order to solve the question, the French waged a challenge according to specific rules set up by the French in order to show whether the Italians were up to the valor of French soldiers. The challenge consisted in a mounted tourney between 13 Italians (the most famous being Ettore Fieramosca), who were part of the Spanish army based in Barletta, and 13 French knights who were based in Canosa di Puglia. The number of 13 knights was set by the French la Motte, who believed that that would give to the Italians an opportunity to refuse the challenge because of the superstition associated with the number 13. The winners would receive as a bounty the weapons and the horses of the other army who had also to pay a ransom of 100 ducats for each knight (gold value in 100 ducats is about US $15,000 in early 2018). Moreover, each army had to provide two hostages as a collateral. 
Prospero Colonna and Fabrizio Colonna were put in charge of making the Italian "team". The captain of the Italians was Fieramosca.

Participants 
For the two armies, the participants were as follows:

Gallery

See also
Battle of Cerignola

References

Further reading

External links

"Official site" of the Disfida

Conflicts in 1503
Military history of Italy
Barletta
Andria
1503 in Italy
Italian Wars